Hippomaneae is a tribe of flowering plants of the family Euphorbiaceae. It comprises 2 subtribes and 33 genera.

Genera

See also
 Taxonomy of the Euphorbiaceae

References

External links

 
Euphorbiaceae tribes